Oskar Svensson (born 7 September 1995) is a Swedish cross-country skier who represents Falun-Borlänge SK.

He competed at the FIS Nordic World Ski Championships 2017 in Lahti, Finland, finishing 19th in the freestyle sprint event. At the 2018 Winter Olympics he finished fifth in the classical sprint event.

Cross-country skiing results
All results are sourced from the International Ski Federation (FIS).

Olympic Games

World Championships

World Cup

Season standings

Individual podiums
2 victories – (1 , 1 ) 
3 podiums – (2 , 1 )

References

External links

1995 births
Living people
Swedish male cross-country skiers
Cross-country skiers at the 2018 Winter Olympics
Cross-country skiers at the 2022 Winter Olympics
Olympic cross-country skiers of Sweden
Tour de Ski skiers
People from Falun